Vladimir Seunig (8 August 1887 – 24 December 1976) was a Slovenian equestrian. He competed in the individual dressage event at the 1924 Summer Olympics.

He is better known as Waldemar Seunig, author of Horsemanship: A Comprehensive Book on Training the Horse and Its Rider still in print in 2023, as a foundational book in dressage training for both rider and mount.

References

External links
 

1887 births
1976 deaths
Slovenian male equestrians
Olympic equestrians of Yugoslavia
Equestrians at the 1924 Summer Olympics
Sportspeople from Ljubljana